Darreh Tey Tahlivan (also Romanized as Darreh Tey Tahlīvan) is a village in Chin Rural District, Ludab District, Boyer-Ahmad County, Kohgiluyeh and Boyer-Ahmad Province, Iran. At the 2006 census, its population was 86, in 16 families.

References 

Populated places in Boyer-Ahmad County